Pusa is a genus of earless seal.

Pusa or PUSA may also refer to:

Music
 The Presidents of the United States of America (band), a rock band
 The Presidents of the United States of America (album), the band's self-titled debut album
 PUSA Inc., a record label founded by The Presidents of the United States of America
 "Pusa Road", a section of "Fire Garden Suite", a song by Steve Vai from his 1996 album Fire Garden
 Pusa, a Czech folk rock band

Organizations 
 President of the United States, the head of state of the United States of America
 List of presidents of the United States
Pusa Polytechnic - a technology school in India
 IHM Pusa
 Indian Agricultural Research Institute (IARI), situated in Pusa, Delhi, also known as Pusa Institute
 Pokémon USA Inc, the American branch of The Pokémon Company
 PUSA – Persatuan Ulama Seluruh Aceh (All Aceh Religious Scholars Association) established by Daud Beureu'eh in 1939

Places
 Pusa, Sarawak, a town in Malaysia.
 Pusa, a block in Samastipur district, Bihar, India
 Pusa, a neighborhood of New Delhi
 Khudiram Bose Pusa railway station, a railway station in Samastipur district, Bihar, India

People
 Marko Pusa, a Finnish darts player

Other uses 
 Pusa, a synonym for Pusana, a for a grasshopper genus
 Guanyin or Bodhisattva, known in Chinese as pusa